George Chiga (28 October 1913 – 8 December 2007) was a Canadian wrestler. He competed in the men's freestyle heavyweight at the 1936 Summer Olympics.

References

External links
 

1913 births
2007 deaths
Canadian male sport wrestlers
Olympic wrestlers of Canada
Wrestlers at the 1936 Summer Olympics
Sportspeople from Regina, Saskatchewan